The Wilcox County School District  is the public school system for Wilcox County, Alabama.  It operates three elementary schools, two secondary schools and an alternative school.  The system educates roughly 2000 students and employs more than 280.

The district is governed by the Wilcox County Board of Education. There are six board members, elected for a term of four years.   A superintendent, hired by the board, and support staff oversee the system on a daily basis. The current superintendent is André P. Saulsberry.

Segregation
The 2012 demographic profile of Wilcox County, showed the population as 27.4% white and 71.8% black. The local schools are effectively racially segregated with the vast majority of White students attending private schools.

 The percentage of students allowed a free school lunch is commonly used as a proxy for poverty.

Private schools in the county

Failing schools
Statewide testing ranks the schools in Alabama. Those in the bottom six percent are listed as "failing." As of early 2018, both Wilcox Central High School and Camden School Of Arts & Technology were included in this category.

References

External links
 

Education in Wilcox County, Alabama
School districts in Alabama